Reilly is an Irish surname (other forms include O'Reilly), and is derived from the Gaelic Ó Raghallaigh Sept that  was based in Counties Cavan and Westmeath. Reilly is among the ten most frequently found surnames in Ireland and although they are very widespread they can be mostly found in the region of the ancestral homeland.

People with the surname Reilly include:

 Alan Reilly, Irish footballer
 Arch Reilly, American baseball player
 Brandon Reilly (musician), frontman of the band "Nightmare of You"
 Brandon Reilly (American football), American football wide receiver
 Brent Reilly, Australian rules footballer
 Charles Herbert Reilly, English architect
 Charles Nelson Reilly, American actor and director
 David Reilly (singer), American singer
 Dianne Reilly, Australian politician
 Donald Reilly, American cartoonist
 Dorcas Reilly, American chef and inventor
 Edward Reilly (disambiguation), several people
 Frank Reilly (footballer) (1894–1956), Scottish footballer
 Frank J. Reilly, American illustrator and art educator
 Ginny Reilly, American folk singer
 Ike Reilly, American musician
 Jack Reilly (artist) (born 1950), American artist
 James Reilly (disambiguation), several people
 Jim Reilly, Irish drummer
 John Reilly (disambiguation), several people
 Kelly Reilly, English actress
 Kevin Reilly (disambiguation), several people
 Lawrie Reilly, Scottish footballer
 Liam Reilly (1955–2021), Irish singer
 Logan Reilly, American plumber
 Long John Reilly, American baseball player
 Maggie Reilly, Scottish singer
 Mal Reilly, English rugby league player
 Matthew Reilly, Australian author
 Mike Reilly (disambiguation), or Michael Reilly, several people
 Molly Reilly, Canadian aviator
 Paddy Reilly, Irish singer
 Paul Reilly (disambiguation), several people
 Pauline Neura Reilly, Australian author and ornithologist
 Rebecca K Reilly, New Zealand author
 Rick Reilly, American sportswriter
 Robert D. Reilly Jr, American rear admiral
 Sean Reilly (disambiguation), several people
 Sidney Reilly, a Russian-born adventurer and Secret Intelligence Service agent
 Thomas Reilly (disambiguation), several people named Thomas, Tom and Tommy
 Tomás Francisco Reilly (1908–1992), American-born Catholic Bishop of San Juan de la Maguana, Dominican Republic
 Trevor Reilly (born 1988), American football player
 Vini Reilly, British post-punk musician
 William K. Reilly, American company director
  Lachlan A. Reilly, Bendigo Blaze In-line Hockey Club, grand final winner

Fictional characters:

 Ben Reilly, fictional comic-book character
 May Parker (née Reilly), fictional comic-book character
 Bernardo O'Reilly, one of the title characters of the film The Magnificent Seven)
 Ignatius J. Reilly, the protagonist of the 1980 novel A Confederacy of Dunces
 Reilly, a soldier and supporting character of the Irish novel series Zom-B

See also
Reilley
Rielly
Reilly (disambiguation)

Surnames of Irish origin
Anglicised Irish-language surnames
English-language surnames